Vasilyovo is a rural locality (a village) in Gorkinskoye Rural Settlement, Kirzhachsky District, Vladimir Oblast, Russia. The population was 34 as of 2010. There are 4 streets.

Geography 
Vasilyovo is located on the Sherna River, 15 km northwest of Kirzhach (the district's administrative centre) by road. Karpovo is the nearest rural locality.

References 

Rural localities in Kirzhachsky District